A pegleg is an artificial leg.

Pegleg, Peg Leg or Peg-Leg may also refer to:
 Richard Lonergan (1900–1925), American mobster and labor racketeer nicknamed "Peg Leg"
 Joe "Pegleg" Morgan (1929–1993), first non-Hispanic member of the Mexican Mafia, an American criminal organization
 Thomas L. Smith (1801–1866), American mountain man
 Daniel "Pegleg" Sullivan, first person to raise the alarm about the Great Chicago Fire of 1871
 Peg-Leg Pete (Disney), a Walt Disney cartoon character
 PegLeg (video game), a 1990s video game for the Macintosh
 Bradford and Foster Brook Railway, also known as the "Peg Leg" from its wooden support piles
 Fulton Chain Railroad (Peg Leg), also known as the "Peg Leg" from its wooden rails
 Peglegs, the sports teams of Stuyvesant High School, New York City

See also
 John Bell Hood (1831–1879), Confederate American Civil War general called "Old Pegleg" by his men
 Cornelis Jol (1597–1641), Dutch corsair and Dutch West India Company admiral nicknamed Houtebeen ("pegleg")
 Blas de Lezo (1689–1741), Spanish admiral nicknamed "Captain Pegleg"
 Pegleg Falls – see List of waterfalls in Oregon, United States

Lists of people by nickname